The Hirth HM 508 was an air-cooled, eight-cylinder, 60° cylinder bank angle inverted-V aircraft engine built in Germany in the 1930s. It had a bore and stroke of 105 mm × 115 mm (4.1 in × 4.5 in) and developed 210 kW (280 hp) at 3,000 rpm.

Variants
HM 8U
HM 508A
HM 508B
HM 508C 
HM 508D  at 3000 rpm
HM 508E 
HM 508F
HM 508G
HM 508H , low fuel consumption variant, with centrifugal supercharger geared at 3.86:1 crankshaft speed for long-range record breaking aircraft.

Applications
Ambrosini S.7
Gotha Go 146
Gotha Go 149
Heinkel He 116
IMAM Ro.63
Messerschmitt Bf 108
Siebel Fh 104
Weserflug We 271 Experimental aircraft

Specifications (HM 508D)

See also

References

20th-century aviation
Aviation history of Germany
1930s aircraft piston engines
1930s German aircraft
Hirth aircraft engines
Inverted aircraft piston engines